Crotoniidae are a family of mites of the Holosomata group that may be the first animal lineage to have abandoned sexual reproduction and then re-evolved it. This is a spectacular case of atavism, and later convergent evolution.

Species
 Crotonia Thorell, 1876
 Crotonia alluaudi (Berlese, 1916) — Africa
 Crotonia americana (Berlese, 1901) — South America
 Crotonia ardala Luxton, 1987 — Australia
 Crotonia blaszaki Szywilewska, Olszanowski & Norton, 2005 — Chile
 Crotonia borbora Luxton, 1987 — Australia
 Crotonia brassicae Wallwork, 1977 — St. Helena
 Crotonia brevicornuta (Wallwork, 1966) — Antarctica
 Crotonia camelus (Berlese, 1910) — New Caledonia
 Crotonia capistrata Luxton, 1987 — Australia
 Crotonia caudalis (Hammer, 1966) — New Zealand
 Crotonia cervicorna Luxton, 1982 — New Zealand
 Crotonia chiloensis Wallwork, 1977 — Chile
 Crotonia cophinaria (Michael, 1908) — Argentina, New Zealand
 Crotonia cupulata Luxton, 1982 — New Zealand
 Crotonia dicella Colloff, 1990 — Natal, South Africa
 Crotonia ecphyla Colloff, 1990 — Natal
 Crotonia flagellata (Balogh & Csiszar, 1963) — South America
 Crotonia jethurmerae Lee, 1985 — South Australia
 Crotonia lanceolata Wallwork, 1977 — St. Helena
 Crotonia longibulbula Luxton, 1982 — New Zealand
 Crotonia lyrata Colloff, 1990 — Natal
 Crotonia marlenae Olszanowski, 1997 — Serra do Mar, Parati area; Brazil
 Crotonia nukuhivae (Jacot, 1934) — Pacific islands
 Crotonia obtecta (Cambridge, 1875) — Chile, New Zealand
 Crotonia ovata Olszanowski, 2000 — Hellyer River gorge: Tasmania
 Crotonia pauropelor Colloff, 1990 — Natal
 Crotonia perforata Wallwork, 1977 — St. Helena
 Crotonia pulchra (Beck, 1962) — Neotropics
 Crotonia reticulata Luxton, 1982 — New Zealand
 Crotonia rothschildi (Berlese, 1916) — Ethiopia
 Crotonia tryjanowskii Olszanowski, 2000 — New England N.P.: New South Wales
 Crotonia tuberculata Luxton, 1982 — New Zealand
 Crotonia unguifera (Michael, 1908) New Zealand
 Holonothrus Wallwork, 1963
 Holonothrus artus Olszanowski, 1999 — Aisen, Queulat National Park, Puerto Cisnes area: Chile; Melanesia
 Holonothrus concavus Wallwork, 1966 — Antarctica
 Holonothrus foliatus Wallwork, 1963 — Antarctica
 Holonothrus gracilis Olszanowski, 1997 — South Island, Nelson Lakes National Park: New Zealand
 Holonothrus mitis Olszanowski, 1991 — Tasmania, Australia
 Holonothrus naskreckii Olszanowski, 1997 — South Island, Nelson Lakes National Park; New Zealand
 Holonothrus nortoni Olszanowski, 1999 — Dominica, Trois Pitons: Leeward Islands
 Holonothrus novaecaledoniae Olszanowski, 1997 — Mount Paine: New Caledonia
 Holonothrus papua Balogh & Balogh, 1986 — Papua New Guinea
 Holonothrus pulcher Hammer, 1966 — New Zealand
 Holonothrus robustus Olszanowski, 1991 — Tasmania, Australia
 Holonothrus venetiolanus Olszanowski, 1999 — Mérida, Laguna Negra: Venezuela; neotropical
 Holonothrus virungensis Norton & Olszanowski, 1989 — Congo: Kinshasa

Footnotes

References
Subías, Luis S. (2007): Listado sistemático, sinonímico y biogeográfico de los ácaros oribátidos (Acariformes: Oribatida) del mundo (Excepto fósiles). PDF
 

Acari families
Acariformes